Toronto Drydock Company is a shipbuilding repair company in Canada and the name of two shipbuilders in the 19th and 20th centuries respectively.

Toronto Dry Dock Company
The first Toronto Dry Dock Company was established in 1847 by William Botsford Jarvis (1799–1864) in the Province of Canada to build ships to ply the waters of the Great Lakes.

Toronto Dry Dock Company Limited
Another Toronto Dry Dock Company Limited was established in 1917 by several partners:

 C. S. Boone – President of the C. S. Boone Dredging and Construction Company Limited
 John E. Russell, 
 Lawrence Solman, manager of the Toronto Ferry Company Limited
 John J. Manley, C. S. Boone Dredging and Construction Company Limited
 Henry J. Dixon

Toronto Dry Dock and its floating dry dock and yard were located along the south edge of Keating Channel, along with the related Toronto Ship Building Company, owned by the same principals. The company acquired the shipbuilding business of Patrick Dixon and son Harry J. Dixon) under the Ontario Companies Act to build larger ships, and during WW I Toronto Shipbuilding constructed two wood-hulled freighters in 1918, the War Ontario and War Toronto, side-launching both into Keating Channel. The company remained in business until 1964 and was later acquired as part of the Port Weller Dry Docks.

The facilities were sold following the bankruptcy of Port Weller Dry Docks Limited, who moved the dry dock to Port Weller, Ontario and sold the facilities to Toronto Harbour Commission. The former dockyard is now used for storage by Harbourfront Centre and Port of Toronto (to store the airport ferries).

Toronto Drydock

The current Toronto Drydock, founded in 1989 is a small marine repair facility built from the former St-Lawrence pulpwood carrier Menier Consol (built in 1962 and converted as floating drydock after 1984) and located in the eastern Portland area in the Turning Basin along Basin Street and across from the former Hearn Generating Station.

History of shipbuilding in Toronto
Shipbuilding in Toronto dates back to the period when shipping was isolated to the Great Lakes. Early ship building was conducted by the Royal Navy for use in the Great Lakes, but several small, medium, and large private shipbuilding concerns developed during the 19th and early 20th centuries.

Polson Iron Works, established in Toronto in 1883, was a major builder of steamers into the 1900s.  Located at the foot of Sherbourne Street, the Iron Works produced around 150 assorted vessels, including ten steel-hulled minesweepers for the Royal Canadian Navy and Royal Navy, and six cargo vessels during World War I. After the war Polson declared bankruptcy and closed in 1919 due to lack orders and tariff protections.

A succession of ship builders were also located at Bathurst Street Wharf, starting with John Doty Engine Works (1875–1892). The yard was purchased by Bertram Engine Works (1893–1905), then by Canadian Shipbuilding Company (1905–1907); and then by Toronto Shipyards (1908–1910). The idled yard was later taken over by Thor Iron Works (1913–1917), which constructed two minesweepers for the Royal Navy and four cargo vessels before selling the yard to Dominion Shipbuilding. Dominion then built a new facility on reclaimed land leased from the Toronto Harbour Commission and constructed twelve merchant ships during and immediately following the war (1917–1921) before ceasing operations. The once again idle ship yard was reactivated during World War II by the Canadian Government to construct Bangor and s (1941–1945), with the yard operated by a succession of companies, starting with Dufferin Shipbuilding Company Limited, then government-owned Toronto Shipbuilding Company Limited, and finally Redfern Construction Company Limited. At the end of the war the yard was closed for good.

A number of other small builders dotted the waterfront east and west of Toronto proper:
 Rouge River
 Highland Creek – Thomas Adams
 Humber River
 Credit River

The Rouge River's ship building was linked to the prolific lumber industry. The shipbuilding industry ranged between 1810 and 1856.

Most of the ships were used for passenger and to carry potash, grain and lumber between Oswego, New York and Toronto, then called York.

See also

 Bathurst Street Wharf

References

External links
 Toronto Dry Dock

Shipbuilding companies of Canada
Companies based in Toronto
Drydocks
History of shipbuilding in Ontario